David Alan Burkholder (October 21, 1936 – October 12, 1999) was a Canadian football player who played for the Winnipeg Blue Bombers. He won the Grey Cup with them in 1958, 1959, 1961 and 1962. He played college football at the University of Minnesota. In 1999, Burkholder died of cancer, aged 62.

References

1936 births
Winnipeg Blue Bombers players
1999 deaths